Fury: Peacemaker is a six issue miniseries written by Garth Ennis and drawn by Darick Robertson. It was published under the Marvel Knights imprint and takes place within the same continuity as Ennis' other Marvel Max and Marvel Knights series. The story functions as an origin story for Nick Fury and takes place before he joined the Howling Commandos.

The series is more conservative about its violence compared to Ennis' other two Fury series.

Publication history
The series was originally published in the US in 2006. It was also reprinted in France in 2012.

Plot
After seeing his troops butchered at Sidi Bou Zid in the lead-up to the battle of Kasserine Pass, Fury has a run-in with Stephen Barkhorn, a German lieutenant-general, who, seeing the broken Fury, advises him that the only way to be good at war is to "learn to enjoy it". Fury soon falls in with a group of irregular SAS soldiers, led by a Captain Kynaston, fighting in the deserts behind German lines. Contrasting the meat grinder at Sidi Bou Zid with the efficiency of Captain Kynaston's unit, Fury learns to truly enjoy war by fighting intelligently.

Reception
The series has been described as far more realistic than other Marvel war comics, and has been praised for portraying Nick Fury in a very flawed light, as a rather ruthless soldier who strives to do the right thing.

Arya Ponto of Artboiled.com stated that the series lacks the excesses that turned people off from Ennis' first Fury series, and that Peacemaker is a swift, excellent WWII caper reminiscent of movies like Where Eagles Dare and Inglourious Basterds that also serves as an updated origin story for Fury.

Prints

Issues

Collected editions

Sequel
The series takes place before Ennis's first Fury series published in 2001 and was later followed by Fury: My War Gone By in 2013.

See also
 2006 in comics
 War comics

References

External links

2006 comics debuts
Comics by Garth Ennis
Marvel Comics limited series
Nick Fury titles
Marvel Comics set during World War II
Prequel comics